Maurice "Moss" Burbidge (April 15, 1896 – 1977) was a pioneering Canadian aviator.

Honours and legacy 

 Trans-Canada (McKee) Trophy (1932)
 Canada's Aviation Hall of Fame (1974)

References
 Oswald, Mary, They Led the Way, Wetaskiwin: Canada's Aviation Hall of Fame, 1999.

External links
 Hall of Fame site

1896 births
1977 deaths
Aviation history of Canada
Canadian aviators
Canadian Aviation Hall of Fame inductees